Contessa Scott is a Canadian former goalball athlete. Having started playing the game at 11 years old, she won two medals with the Canada women's national goalball team in 2000 and 2004.

References

Living people
Sportspeople from Prince Edward Island
Paralympic goalball players of Canada
Goalball players at the 2004 Summer Paralympics
Goalball players at the 2000 Summer Paralympics
Paralympic gold medalists for Canada
Year of birth missing (living people)